Cannelle may refer to:
 the French word for cinnamon
 a character in Passe-Partout, a Quebec French language children's television program

Places 
 Cannelle, a commune in the Corse-du-Sud department of France on the island of Corsica
 a bay in Isola del Giglio, Italy

Other 
 Ambre Cannelle, a fragrance by French perfume manufacturer Creed
 Fontana delle Sette Cannelle, a fountain in Tuscania, Italy
 Fontana delle 99 Cannelle, a fountain in L'Aquila, Italy
 Torre delle Cannelle, a tower in Talamone, Italy

See also 
 Cannella (disambiguation), various meanings including a surname